A computer mouse (plural mice, also mouses) is a hand-held pointing device that detects two-dimensional motion relative to a surface. This motion is typically translated into the motion of a pointer on a display, which allows a smooth control of the graphical user interface of a computer.

The first public demonstration of a mouse controlling a computer system was in 1968. Mice originally used two separate wheels to track movement across a surface: one in the X-dimension and one in the Y. Later, the standard design shifted to utilize a ball rolling on a surface to detect motion. Most modern mice use optical sensors that have no moving parts. Though originally all mice were connected to a computer by a cable, many modern mice are cordless, relying on short-range radio communication with the connected system.

In addition to moving a cursor, computer mice have one or more buttons to allow operations such as the selection of a menu item on a display. Mice often also feature other elements, such as touch surfaces and scroll wheels, which enable additional control and dimensional input.

Etymology 

The earliest known written use of the term mouse in reference to a computer pointing device is in Bill English's July 1965 publication, "Computer-Aided Display Control", likely originating from its resemblance to the shape and size of a mouse, a rodent, with the cord resembling its tail. The popularity of wireless mice without cords makes the resemblance less obvious.

According to Roger Bates, a hardware designer under English, the term also came about because the cursor on the screen was for some unknown reason referred to as "CAT" and was seen by the team as if it would be chasing the new desktop device.

The plural for the small rodent is always "mice" in modern usage. The plural for a computer mouse is either "mice" or "mouses" according to most dictionaries, with "mice" being more common. The first recorded plural usage is "mice"; the online Oxford Dictionaries cites a 1984 use, and earlier uses include J. C. R. Licklider's "The Computer as a Communication Device" of 1968.

History

Stationary trackballs 
The trackball, a related pointing device, was invented in 1946 by Ralph Benjamin as part of a post-World War II-era fire-control radar plotting system called the Comprehensive Display System (CDS). Benjamin was then working for the British Royal Navy Scientific Service. Benjamin's project used analog computers to calculate the future position of target aircraft based on several initial input points provided by a user with a joystick. Benjamin felt that a more elegant input device was needed and invented what they called a "roller ball" for this purpose.

The device was patented in 1947, but only a prototype using a metal ball rolling on two rubber-coated wheels was ever built, and the device was kept as a military secret.

Another early trackball was built by Kenyon Taylor, a British electrical engineer working in collaboration with Tom Cranston and Fred Longstaff. Taylor was part of the original Ferranti Canada, working on the Royal Canadian Navy's DATAR (Digital Automated Tracking and Resolving) system in 1952.

DATAR was similar in concept to Benjamin's display. The trackball used four disks to pick up motion, two each for the X and Y directions. Several rollers provided mechanical support. When the ball was rolled, the pickup discs spun and contacts on their outer rim made periodic contact with wires, producing pulses of output with each movement of the ball. By counting the pulses, the physical movement of the ball could be determined. A digital computer calculated the tracks and sent the resulting data to other ships in a task force using pulse-code modulation radio signals. This trackball used a standard Canadian five-pin bowling ball. It was not patented, since it was a secret military project.

Engelbart's first "mouse" 

Douglas Engelbart of the Stanford Research Institute (now SRI International) has been credited in published books by Thierry Bardini, Paul Ceruzzi, Howard Rheingold, and several others as the inventor of the computer mouse. Engelbart was also recognized as such in various obituary titles after his death in July 2013.

By 1963, Engelbart had already established a research lab at SRI, the Augmentation Research Center (ARC), to pursue his objective of developing both hardware and software computer technology to "augment" human intelligence. That November, while attending a conference on computer graphics in Reno, Nevada, Engelbart began to ponder how to adapt the underlying principles of the planimeter to inputting X- and Y-coordinate data. On 14 November 1963, he first recorded his thoughts in his personal notebook about something he initially called a "bug", which in a "3-point" form could have a "drop point and 2 orthogonal wheels". He wrote that the "bug" would be "easier" and "more natural" to use, and unlike a stylus, it would stay still when let go, which meant it would be "much better for coordination with the keyboard".

In 1964, Bill English joined ARC, where he helped Engelbart build the first mouse prototype. They christened the device the mouse as early models had a cord attached to the rear part of the device which looked like a tail, and in turn resembled the common mouse. According to Roger Bates, a hardware designer under English, another reason for choosing this name was because the cursor on the screen was also referred to as "CAT" at this time.

As noted above, this "mouse" was first mentioned in print in a July 1965 report, on which English was the lead author. On 9 December 1968, Engelbart publicly demonstrated the mouse at what would come to be known as The Mother of All Demos. Engelbart never received any royalties for it, as his employer SRI held the patent, which expired before the mouse became widely used in personal computers. In any event, the invention of the mouse was just a small part of Engelbart's much larger project of augmenting human intellect.

Several other experimental pointing-devices developed for Engelbart's oN-Line System (NLS) exploited different body movements – for example, head-mounted devices attached to the chin or nose – but ultimately the mouse won out because of its speed and convenience. The first mouse, a bulky device (pictured) used two potentiometers perpendicular to each other and connected to wheels: the rotation of each wheel translated into motion along one axis. At the time of the "Mother of All Demos", Engelbart's group had been using their second generation, 3-button mouse for about a year.

First rolling-ball mouse 

On 2 October 1968, three years after Engelbart's prototype but more than two months before his public demo, a mouse device named  (German for "rolling ball control") was shown in a sales brochure by the German company AEG-Telefunken as an optional input device for the SIG 100 vector graphics terminal, part of the system around their process computer TR 86 and the  main frame. Based on an even earlier trackball device, the mouse device had been developed by the company since 1966 in what had been a parallel and independent discovery. As the name suggests and unlike Engelbart's mouse, the Telefunken model already had a ball (diameter 40 mm, weight 40 g) and two mechanical 4-bit rotational position transducers with Gray code-like states, allowing easy movement in any direction. The bits remained stable for at least two successive states to relax debouncing requirements. This arrangement was chosen so that the data could also be transmitted to the TR 86 front end process computer and over longer distance telex lines with c. 50 baud. Weighing 465 g, the device with a total height of about 7 cm came in a c. 12 cm diameter hemispherical injection-molded thermoplastic casing featuring one central push button.

As noted above, the device was based on an earlier trackball-like device (also named ) that was embedded into radar flight control desks. It was part of the corresponding work station system SAP 300 and the terminal SIG 3001, which had been designed and developed since 1963. Development for the TR 440 main frame began in 1965. This led to the development of the TR 86 process computer system with its SIG 100-86 terminal. Inspired by a discussion with a university customer, Mallebrein came up with the idea of "reversing" the existing  trackball into a moveable mouse-like device in 1966, so that customers did not have to be bothered with mounting holes for the earlier trackball device. The device was finished in early 1968, and together with light pens and trackballs, it was commercially offered as an optional input device for their system starting later that year. They were installed at more than 20 German universities including RWTH Aachen, Technical University Berlin, University of Stuttgart and Konstanz. Several  mice installed at the Leibniz Supercomputing Centre in Munich in 1972 are well preserved in a museum, two others survived in a museum at Stuttgart university, two in Hamburg, the one from Aachen at the Computer History Museum in the US, and yet another sample was recently donated to the Heinz Nixdorf MuseumsForum (HNF) in Paderborn. Anecdotal reports claim that Telefunken's attempt to patent the device was rejected by the German Patent Office due to lack of inventiveness. For the air traffic control system, the Mallebrein team had already developed a precursor to touch screens in form of an ultrasonic-curtain-based pointing device in front of the display. In 1970, they developed a device named "Touchinput-" ("touch input facility") based on a conductively coated glass screen.

First mice on personal computers and workstations 

The Xerox Alto was one of the first computers designed for individual use in 1973 and is regarded as the first modern computer to use a mouse. Inspired by PARC's Alto, the Lilith, a computer which had been developed by a team around Niklaus Wirth at ETH Zürich between 1978 and 1980, provided a mouse as well. The third marketed version of an integrated mouse shipped as a part of a computer and intended for personal computer navigation came with the Xerox 8010 Star in 1981.

By 1982, the Xerox 8010 was probably the best-known computer with a mouse. The Sun-1 also came with a mouse, and the forthcoming Apple Lisa was rumored to use one, but the peripheral remained obscure; Jack Hawley of The Mouse House reported that one buyer for a large organization believed at first that his company sold lab mice. Hawley, who manufactured mice for Xerox, stated that "Practically, I have the market all to myself right now"; a Hawley mouse cost $415. In 1982, Logitech introduced the P4 Mouse at the Comdex trade show in Las Vegas, its first hardware mouse. That same year Microsoft made the decision to make the MS-DOS program Microsoft Word mouse-compatible, and developed the first PC-compatible mouse. Microsoft's mouse shipped in 1983, thus beginning the Microsoft Hardware division of the company. However, the mouse remained relatively obscure until the appearance of the Macintosh 128K (which included an updated version of the single-button Lisa Mouse) in 1984, and of the Amiga 1000 and the Atari ST in 1985.

Operation 

A mouse typically controls the motion of a pointer in two dimensions in a graphical user interface (GUI). The mouse turns movements of the hand backward and forward, left and right into equivalent electronic signals that in turn are used to move the pointer.

The relative movements of the mouse on the surface are applied to the position of the pointer on the screen, which signals the point where actions of the user take place, so hand movements are replicated by the pointer. Clicking or pointing (stopping movement while the cursor is within the bounds of an area) can select files, programs or actions from a list of names, or (in graphical interfaces) through small images called "icons" and other elements. For example, a text file might be represented by a picture of a paper notebook and clicking while the cursor points at this icon might cause a text editing program to open the file in a window.

Different ways of operating the mouse cause specific things to happen in the GUI:
 Point: stop the motion of the pointer while it is inside the boundaries of what the user wants to interact with. This act of pointing is what the "pointer" and "pointing device" are named after. In web design lingo, pointing is referred to as "hovering." This usage spread to web programming and Android programming, and is now found in many contexts.
 Click: pressing and releasing a button.
 (left) Single-click: clicking the main button.
 (left) Double-click: clicking the button two times in quick succession counts as a different gesture than two separate single clicks.
 (left) Triple-click: clicking the button three times in quick succession counts as a different gesture than three separate single clicks. Triple clicks are far less common in traditional navigation.
 Right-click: clicking the secondary button. In modern applications, this frequently opens a context menu.
 Middle-click: clicking the tertiary button.
 Drag: pressing and holding a button, and moving the mouse before releasing the button. This is frequently used to move or copy files or other objects via drag and drop; other uses include selecting text and drawing in graphics applications.
 Mouse button chording or chord clicking:
 Clicking with more than one button simultaneously.
 Clicking while simultaneously typing a letter on the keyboard.
 Clicking and rolling the mouse wheel simultaneously.
 Clicking while holding down a modifier key.
 Moving the pointer a long distance: When a practical limit of mouse movement is reached, one lifts up the mouse, brings it to the opposite edge of the working area while it is held above the surface, and then lowers it back onto the working surface. This is often not necessary, because acceleration software detects fast movement, and moves the pointer significantly faster in proportion than for slow mouse motion.
 Multi-touch: this method is similar to a multi-touch touchpad on a laptop with support for tap input for multiple fingers, the most famous example being the Apple Magic Mouse.

Gestures 

Users can also employ mice gesturally, meaning that a stylized motion of the mouse cursor itself, called a "gesture", can issue a command or map to a specific action. For example, in a drawing program, moving the mouse in a rapid "x" motion over a shape might delete the shape.

Gestural interfaces occur more rarely than plain pointing-and-clicking, and people often find them more difficult to use because they require finer motor control from the user. However, a few gestural conventions have become widespread, including the drag and drop gesture, in which:

 The user presses the mouse button while the mouse cursor points at an interface object
 The user moves the cursor to a different location while holding the button down
 The user releases the mouse button

For example, a user might drag-and-drop a picture representing a file onto a picture of a trash can, thus instructing the system to delete the file.

Standard semantic gestures include:
 Crossing-based goal
 Drag and drop
 Menu traversal
 Pointing
 Mouseover (pointing or hovering)
 Selection

Specific uses 
Other uses of the mouse's input occur commonly in special application domains. In interactive three-dimensional graphics, the mouse's motion often translates directly into changes in the virtual objects' or camera's orientation. For example, in the first-person shooter genre of games (see below), players usually employ the mouse to control the direction in which the virtual player's "head" faces: moving the mouse up will cause the player to look up, revealing the view above the player's head. A related function makes an image of an object rotate so that all sides can be examined. 3D design and animation software often modally chord many different combinations to allow objects and cameras to be rotated and moved through space with the few axes of movement mice can detect.

When mice have more than one button, the software may assign different functions to each button. Often, the primary (leftmost in a right-handed configuration) button on the mouse will select items, and the secondary (rightmost in a right-handed) button will bring up a menu of alternative actions applicable to that item. For example, on platforms with more than one button, the Mozilla web browser will follow a link in response to a primary button click, will bring up a contextual menu of alternative actions for that link in response to a secondary-button click, and will often open the link in a new tab or window in response to a click with the tertiary (middle) mouse button.

Types

Mechanical mice 

The German company Telefunken published on their early ball mouse on 2 October 1968. Telefunken's mouse was sold as optional equipment for their computer systems. Bill English, builder of Engelbart's original mouse, created a ball mouse in 1972 while working for Xerox PARC.

The ball mouse replaced the external wheels with a single ball that could rotate in any direction. It came as part of the hardware package of the Xerox Alto computer. Perpendicular chopper wheels housed inside the mouse's body chopped beams of light on the way to light sensors, thus detecting in their turn the motion of the ball. This variant of the mouse resembled an inverted trackball and became the predominant form used with personal computers throughout the 1980s and 1990s. The Xerox PARC group also settled on the modern technique of using both hands to type on a full-size keyboard and grabbing the mouse when required.

The ball mouse has two freely rotating rollers. These are located 90 degrees apart. One roller detects the forward-backward motion of the mouse and the other the left-right motion. Opposite the two rollers is a third one (white, in the photo, at 45 degrees) that is spring-loaded to push the ball against the other two rollers. Each roller is on the same shaft as an encoder wheel that has slotted edges; the slots interrupt infrared light beams to generate electrical pulses that represent wheel movement. Each wheel's disc has a pair of light beams, located so that a given beam becomes interrupted or again starts to pass light freely when the other beam of the pair is about halfway between changes.

Simple logic circuits interpret the relative timing to indicate which direction the wheel is rotating. This incremental rotary encoder scheme is sometimes called quadrature encoding of the wheel rotation, as the two optical sensors produce signals that are in approximately quadrature phase. The mouse sends these signals to the computer system via the mouse cable, directly as logic signals in very old mice such as the Xerox mice, and via a data-formatting IC in modern mice. The driver software in the system converts the signals into motion of the mouse cursor along X and Y axes on the computer screen.

The ball is mostly steel, with a precision spherical rubber surface. The weight of the ball, given an appropriate working surface under the mouse, provides a reliable grip so the mouse's movement is transmitted accurately. Ball mice and wheel mice were manufactured for Xerox by Jack Hawley, doing business as The Mouse House in Berkeley, California, starting in 1975. Based on another invention by Jack Hawley, proprietor of the Mouse House, Honeywell produced another type of mechanical mouse. Instead of a ball, it had two wheels rotating at off axes. Key Tronic later produced a similar product.

Modern computer mice took form at the École Polytechnique Fédérale de Lausanne (EPFL) under the inspiration of Professor Jean-Daniel Nicoud and at the hands of engineer and watchmaker André Guignard. This new design incorporated a single hard rubber mouseball and three buttons, and remained a common design until the mainstream adoption of the scroll-wheel mouse during the 1990s. In 1985, René Sommer added a microprocessor to Nicoud's and Guignard's design. Through this innovation, Sommer is credited with inventing a significant component of the mouse, which made it more "intelligent"; though optical mice from Mouse Systems had incorporated microprocessors by 1984.

Another type of mechanical mouse, the "analog mouse" (now generally regarded as obsolete), uses potentiometers rather than encoder wheels, and is typically designed to be plug compatible with an analog joystick. The "Color Mouse", originally marketed by RadioShack for their Color Computer (but also usable on MS-DOS machines equipped with analog joystick ports, provided the software accepted joystick input) was the best-known example.

Optical and laser mice 

Early optical mice relied entirely on one or more light-emitting diodes (LEDs) and an imaging array of photodiodes to detect movement relative to the underlying surface, eschewing the internal moving parts a mechanical mouse uses in addition to its optics. A laser mouse is an optical mouse that uses coherent (laser) light.

The earliest optical mice detected movement on pre-printed mousepad surfaces, whereas the modern LED optical mouse works on most opaque diffuse surfaces; it is usually unable to detect movement on specular surfaces like polished stone. Laser diodes provide good resolution and precision, improving performance on opaque specular surfaces. Later, more surface-independent optical mice use an optoelectronic sensor (essentially, a tiny low-resolution video camera) to take successive images of the surface on which the mouse operates. Battery powered, wireless optical mice flash the LED intermittently to save power, and only glow steadily when movement is detected.

Inertial and gyroscopic mice 
Often called "air mice" since they do not require a surface to operate, inertial mice use a tuning fork or other accelerometer (US Patent 4787051) to detect rotary movement for every axis supported. The most common models (manufactured by Logitech and Gyration) work using 2 degrees of rotational freedom and are insensitive to spatial translation. The user requires only small wrist rotations to move the cursor, reducing user fatigue or "gorilla arm".

Usually cordless, they often have a switch to deactivate the movement circuitry between use, allowing the user freedom of movement without affecting the cursor position. A patent for an inertial mouse claims that such mice consume less power than optically based mice, and offer increased sensitivity, reduced weight and increased ease-of-use. In combination with a wireless keyboard an inertial mouse can offer alternative ergonomic arrangements which do not require a flat work surface, potentially alleviating some types of repetitive motion injuries related to workstation posture.

3D mice 

Also known as bats, flying mice, or wands, these devices generally function through ultrasound and provide at least three degrees of freedom. Probably the best known example would be 3Dconnexion ("Logitech's SpaceMouse") from the early 1990s. In the late 1990s Kantek introduced the 3D RingMouse. This wireless mouse was worn on a ring around a finger, which enabled the thumb to access three buttons. The mouse was tracked in three dimensions by a base station. Despite a certain appeal, it was finally discontinued because it did not provide sufficient resolution.

One example of a 2000s consumer 3D pointing device is the Wii Remote. While primarily a motion-sensing device (that is, it can determine its orientation and direction of movement), Wii Remote can also detect its spatial position by comparing the distance and position of the lights from the IR emitter using its integrated IR camera (since the nunchuk accessory lacks a camera, it can only tell its current heading and orientation). The obvious drawback to this approach is that it can only produce spatial coordinates while its camera can see the sensor bar. More accurate consumer devices have since been released, including the PlayStation Move, the Razer Hydra, and the controllers part of the HTC Vive virtual reality system. All of these devices can accurately detect position and orientation in 3D space regardless of angle relative to the sensor station.

A mouse-related controller called the SpaceBall has a ball placed above the work surface that can easily be gripped. With spring-loaded centering, it sends both translational as well as angular displacements on all six axes, in both directions for each. In November 2010 a German Company called Axsotic introduced a new concept of 3D mouse called 3D Spheric Mouse. This new concept of a true six degree-of-freedom input device uses a ball to rotate in 3 axes and an elastic polymer anchored tetrahedron inspired suspension for translating the ball without any limitations. A contactless sensor design uses a magnetic sensor array for sensing three aches translation and two optical mouse sensors for three aches rotation. The special tetrahedron suspension allows a user to rotate the ball with the fingers while input translations with the hand-wrist motion.

Tactile mice 
In 2000, Logitech introduced a "tactile mouse" known as the "iFeel Mouse" developed by Immersion Corporation that contained a small actuator to enable the mouse to generate simulated physical sensations. Such a mouse can augment user-interfaces with haptic feedback, such as giving feedback when crossing a window boundary. To surf the internet by touch-enabled mouse was first developed in 1996 and first implemented commercially by the Wingman Force Feedback Mouse. It requires the user to be able to feel depth or hardness; this ability was realized with the first electrorheological tactile mice but never marketed.

Pucks 
Tablet digitizers are sometimes used with accessories called pucks, devices which rely on absolute positioning, but can be configured for sufficiently mouse-like relative tracking that they are sometimes marketed as mice.

Ergonomic mice 

As the name suggests, this type of mouse is intended to provide optimum comfort and avoid injuries such as carpal tunnel syndrome, arthritis, and other repetitive strain injuries. It is designed to fit natural hand position and movements, to reduce discomfort.

When holding a typical mouse, the ulna and radius bones on the arm are crossed. Some designs attempt to place the palm more vertically, so the bones take more natural parallel position. Some limit wrist movement, encouraging arm movement instead, that may be less precise but more optimal from the health point of view. A mouse may be angled from the thumb downward to the opposite side – this is known to reduce wrist pronation. However such optimizations make the mouse right or left hand specific, making more problematic to change the tired hand. Time has criticized manufacturers for offering few or no left-handed ergonomic mice: "Oftentimes I felt like I was dealing with someone who'd never actually met a left-handed person before."

Another solution is a pointing bar device. The so-called roller bar mouse is positioned snugly in front of the keyboard, thus allowing bi-manual accessibility.

Gaming mice 

These mice are specifically designed for use in computer games. They typically employ a wider array of controls and buttons and have designs that differ radically from traditional mice. They may also have decorative monochrome or programmable RGB LED lighting. The additional buttons can often be used for changing the sensitivity of the mouse or they can be assigned (programmed) to macros (i.e., for opening a program or for use instead of a key combination). It is also common for game mice, especially those designed for use in real-time strategy games such as StarCraft, or in multiplayer online battle arena games such as League of Legends to have a relatively high sensitivity, measured in dots per inch (DPI), which can be as high as 25,600. DPI and CPI are the same values that refer to the mouse’s sensitivity. DPI is a misnomer used in the gaming world, and many manufacturers use it to refer to CPI, counts per inch.  Some advanced mice from gaming manufacturers also allow users to adjust the weight of the mouse by adding or subtracting weights to allow for easier control. Ergonomic quality is also an important factor in gaming mouse, as extended gameplay times may render further use of the mouse to be uncomfortable. Some mice have been designed to have adjustable features such as removable and/or elongated palm rests, horizontally adjustable thumb rests and pinky rests. Some mice may include several different rests with their products to ensure comfort for a wider range of target consumers. Gaming mice are held by gamers in three styles of grip:
 Palm Grip: the hand rests on the mouse, with extended fingers.
 Claw Grip: palm rests on the mouse, bent fingers.
 Finger-Tip Grip: bent fingers, palm does not touch the mouse.

Connectivity and communication protocols 

To transmit their input, typical cabled mice use a thin electrical cord terminating in a standard connector, such as RS-232C, PS/2, ADB, or USB. Cordless mice instead transmit data via infrared radiation (see IrDA) or radio (including Bluetooth), although many such cordless interfaces are themselves connected through the aforementioned wired serial buses.

While the electrical interface and the format of the data transmitted by commonly available mice is currently standardized on USB, in the past it varied between different manufacturers. A bus mouse used a dedicated interface card for connection to an IBM PC or compatible computer.

Mouse use in DOS applications became more common after the introduction of the Microsoft Mouse, largely because Microsoft provided an open standard for communication between applications and mouse driver software. Thus, any application written to use the Microsoft standard could use a mouse with a driver that implements the same API, even if the mouse hardware itself was incompatible with Microsoft's. This driver provides the state of the buttons and the distance the mouse has moved in units that its documentation calls "mickeys".

Early mice 

In the 1970s, the Xerox Alto mouse, and in the 1980s the Xerox optical mouse, used a quadrature-encoded X and Y interface. This two-bit encoding per dimension had the property that only one bit of the two would change at a time, like a Gray code or Johnson counter, so that the transitions would not be misinterpreted when asynchronously sampled.

The earliest mass-market mice, such as on the original Macintosh, Amiga, and Atari ST mice used a D-subminiature 9-pin connector to send the quadrature-encoded X and Y axis signals directly, plus one pin per mouse button. The mouse was a simple optomechanical device, and the decoding circuitry was all in the main computer.

The DE-9 connectors were designed to be electrically compatible with the joysticks popular on numerous 8-bit systems, such as the Commodore 64 and the Atari 2600. Although the ports could be used for both purposes, the signals must be interpreted differently. As a result, plugging a mouse into a joystick port causes the "joystick" to continuously move in some direction, even if the mouse stays still, whereas plugging a joystick into a mouse port causes the "mouse" to only be able to move a single pixel in each direction.

Serial interface and protocol 

Because the IBM PC did not have a quadrature decoder built in, early PC mice used the RS-232C serial port to communicate encoded mouse movements, as well as provide power to the mouse's circuits. The Mouse Systems Corporation version used a five-byte protocol and supported three buttons. The Microsoft version used a three-byte protocol and supported two buttons. Due to the incompatibility between the two protocols, some manufacturers sold serial mice with a mode switch: "PC" for MSC mode, "MS" for Microsoft mode.

Apple Desktop Bus 

In 1986 Apple first implemented the Apple Desktop Bus allowing the daisy chaining of up to 16 devices, including mice and other devices on the same bus with no configuration whatsoever. Featuring only a single data pin, the bus used a purely polled approach to device communications and survived as the standard on mainstream models (including a number of non-Apple workstations) until 1998 when Apple's iMac line of computers joined the industry-wide switch to using USB. Beginning with the Bronze Keyboard PowerBook G3 in May 1999, Apple dropped the external ADB port in favor of USB, but retained an internal ADB connection in the PowerBook G4 for communication with its built-in keyboard and trackpad until early 2005.

PS/2 interface and protocol 

With the arrival of the IBM PS/2 personal-computer series in 1987, IBM introduced the eponymous PS/2 port for mice and keyboards, which other manufacturers rapidly adopted. The most visible change was the use of a round 6-pin mini-DIN, in lieu of the former 5-pin MIDI style full sized DIN 41524 connector. In default mode (called stream mode) a PS/2 mouse communicates motion, and the state of each button, by means of 3-byte packets. For any motion, button press or button release event, a PS/2 mouse sends, over a bi-directional serial port, a sequence of three bytes, with the following format:

Here, XS and YS represent the sign bits of the movement vectors, XV and YV indicate an overflow in the respective vector component, and LB, MB and RB indicate the status of the left, middle and right mouse buttons (1 = pressed). PS/2 mice also understand several commands for reset and self-test, switching between different operating modes, and changing the resolution of the reported motion vectors.

A Microsoft IntelliMouse relies on an extension of the PS/2 protocol: the ImPS/2 or IMPS/2 protocol (the abbreviation combines the concepts of "IntelliMouse" and "PS/2"). It initially operates in standard PS/2 format, for backward compatibility. After the host sends a special command sequence, it switches to an extended format in which a fourth byte carries information about wheel movements. The IntelliMouse Explorer works analogously, with the difference that its 4-byte packets also allow for two additional buttons (for a total of five).

Mouse vendors also use other extended formats, often without providing public documentation. The Typhoon mouse uses 6-byte packets which can appear as a sequence of two standard 3-byte packets, such that an ordinary PS/2 driver can handle them. For 3-D (or 6-degree-of-freedom) input, vendors have made many extensions both to the hardware and to software. In the late 1990s, Logitech created ultrasound based tracking which gave 3D input to a few millimeters accuracy, which worked well as an input device but failed as a profitable product. In 2008, Motion4U introduced its "OptiBurst" system using IR tracking for use as a Maya (graphics software) plugin.

USB 

The industry-standard USB (Universal Serial Bus) protocol and its connector have become widely used for mice; it is among the most popular types.

Cordless or wireless 
Cordless or wireless mice transmit data via radio. Some mice connect to the computer through Bluetooth or Wi-Fi, while others use a receiver that plugs into the computer, for example through a USB port.

Many mice that use a USB receiver have a storage compartment for it inside the mouse. Some "nano receivers" are designed to be small enough to remain plugged into a laptop during transport, while still being large enough to easily remove.

Operating system support 
MS-DOS and Windows 1.0 support connecting a mouse such as a Microsoft Mouse via multiple interfaces: BallPoint, Bus (InPort), Serial port or PS/2.

Windows 98 added built-in support for USB Human Interface Device class (USB HID), with native vertical scrolling support. Windows 2000 and Windows Me expanded this built-in support to 5-button mice.

Windows XP Service Pack 2 introduced a Bluetooth stack, allowing Bluetooth mice to be used without any USB receivers. Windows Vista added native support for horizontal scrolling and standardized wheel movement granularity for finer scrolling.

Windows 8 introduced BLE (Bluetooth Low Energy) mouse/HID support.

Multiple-mouse systems 
Some systems allow two or more mice to be used at once as input devices. Late-1980s era home computers such as the Amiga used this to allow computer games with two players interacting on the same computer (Lemmings and The Settlers for example). The same idea is sometimes used in collaborative software, e.g. to simulate a whiteboard that multiple users can draw on without passing a single mouse around.

Microsoft Windows, since Windows 98, has supported multiple simultaneous pointing devices. Because Windows only provides a single screen cursor, using more than one device at the same time requires cooperation of users or applications designed for multiple input devices.

Multiple mice are often used in multi-user gaming in addition to specially designed devices that provide several input interfaces.

Windows also has full support for multiple input/mouse configurations for multi-user environments.

Starting with Windows XP, Microsoft introduced an SDK for developing applications that allow multiple input devices to be used at the same time with independent cursors and independent input points. However, it no longer appears to be available.

The introduction of Windows Vista and Microsoft Surface (now known as Microsoft PixelSense) introduced a new set of input APIs that were adopted into Windows 7, allowing for 50 points/cursors, all controlled by independent users. The new input points provide traditional mouse input; however, they were designed with other input technologies like touch and image in mind. They inherently offer 3D coordinates along with pressure, size, tilt, angle, mask, and even an image bitmap to see and recognize the input point/object on the screen.

As of 2009, Linux distributions and other operating systems that use X.Org, such as OpenSolaris and FreeBSD, support 255 cursors/input points through Multi-Pointer X. However, currently no window managers support Multi-Pointer X leaving it relegated to custom software usage.

There have also been propositions of having a single operator use two mice simultaneously as a more sophisticated means of controlling various graphics and multimedia applications.

Buttons 

Mouse buttons are microswitches which can be pressed to select or interact with an element of a graphical user interface, producing a distinctive clicking sound.

Since around the late 1990s, the three-button scrollmouse has become the de facto standard. Users most commonly employ the second button to invoke a contextual menu in the computer's software user interface, which contains options specifically tailored to the interface element over which the mouse cursor currently sits. By default, the primary mouse button sits located on the left-hand side of the mouse, for the benefit of right-handed users; left-handed users can usually reverse this configuration via software.

Scrolling 

Nearly all mice now have an integrated input primarily intended for scrolling on top, usually a single-axis digital wheel or rocker switch which can also be depressed to act as a third button. Though less common, many mice instead have two-axis inputs such as a tiltable wheel, trackball, or touchpad. Those with a trackball may be designed to stay stationary, using the trackball instead of moving the mouse.

Speed 
Mickeys per second is a unit of measurement for the speed and movement direction of a computer mouse, where direction is often expressed as "horizontal" versus "vertical" mickey count. However, speed can also refer to the ratio between how many pixels the cursor moves on the screen and how far the mouse moves on the mouse pad, which may be expressed as pixels per mickey, pixels per inch, or pixels per centimeter.

The computer industry often measures mouse sensitivity in terms of counts per inch (CPI), commonly expressed as dots per inch (DPI)the number of steps the mouse will report when it moves one inch. In early mice, this specification was called pulses per inch (ppi). The mickey originally referred to one of these counts, or one resolvable step of motion. If the default mouse-tracking condition involves moving the cursor by one screen-pixel or dot on-screen per reported step, then the CPI does equate to DPI: dots of cursor motion per inch of mouse motion. The CPI or DPI as reported by manufacturers depends on how they make the mouse; the higher the CPI, the faster the cursor moves with mouse movement. However, software can adjust the mouse sensitivity, making the cursor move faster or slower than its CPI.  software can change the speed of the cursor dynamically, taking into account the mouse's absolute speed and the movement from the last stop-point. In most software, an example being the Windows platforms, this setting is named "speed", referring to "cursor precision". However, some operating systems name this setting "acceleration", the typical Apple OS designation. This term is incorrect. Mouse acceleration in most mouse software refers to the change in speed of the cursor over time while the mouse movement is constant.

For simple software, when the mouse starts to move, the software will count the number of "counts" or "mickeys" received from the mouse and will move the cursor across the screen by that number of pixels (or multiplied by a rate factor, typically less than 1). The cursor will move slowly on the screen, with good precision. When the movement of the mouse passes the value set for some threshold, the software will start to move the cursor faster, with a greater rate factor. Usually, the user can set the value of the second rate factor by changing the "acceleration" setting.

Operating systems sometimes apply acceleration, referred to as "ballistics", to the motion reported by the mouse. For example, versions of Windows prior to Windows XP doubled reported values above a configurable threshold, and then optionally doubled them again above a second configurable threshold. These doublings applied separately in the X and Y directions, resulting in very nonlinear response.

Mousepads 

Engelbart's original mouse did not require a mousepad; the mouse had two large wheels which could roll on virtually any surface. However, most subsequent mechanical mice starting with the steel roller ball mouse have required a mousepad for optimal performance.

The mousepad, the most common mouse accessory, appears most commonly in conjunction with mechanical mice, because to roll smoothly the ball requires more friction than common desk surfaces usually provide. So-called "hard mousepads" for gamers or optical/laser mice also exist.

Most optical and laser mice do not require a pad, the notable exception being early optical mice which relied on a grid on the pad to detect movement (e.g. Mouse Systems). Whether to use a hard or soft mousepad with an optical mouse is largely a matter of personal preference. One exception occurs when the desk surface creates problems for the optical or laser tracking, for example, a transparent or reflective surface, such as glass.

Some mice also come with small "pads" attached to the bottom surface, also called mouse feet or mouse skates, that help the user slide the mouse smoothly across surfaces.

In the marketplace 

Around 1981, Xerox included mice with its Xerox Star, based on the mouse used in the 1970s on the Alto computer at Xerox PARC. Sun Microsystems, Symbolics, Lisp Machines Inc., and Tektronix also shipped workstations with mice, starting in about 1981. Later, inspired by the Star, Apple Computer released the Apple Lisa, which also used a mouse. However, none of these products achieved large-scale success. Only with the release of the Apple Macintosh in 1984 did the mouse see widespread use.

The Macintosh design, commercially successful and technically influential, led many other vendors to begin producing mice or including them with their other computer products (by 1986, Atari ST, Amiga, Windows 1.0, GEOS for the Commodore 64, and the Apple IIGS).

The widespread adoption of graphical user interfaces in the software of the 1980s and 1990s made mice all but indispensable for controlling computers. In November 2008, Logitech built their billionth mouse.

Use in games 

The device often functions as an interface for PC-based computer games and sometimes for video game consoles. The Classic Mac OS Desk Accessory Puzzle in 1984 was the first game designed specifically for a mouse.

First-person shooters 

FPSs naturally lend themselves to separate and simultaneous control of the player's movement and aim, and on computers this has traditionally been achieved with a combination of keyboard and mouse. Players use the X-axis of the mouse for looking (or turning) left and right, and the Y-axis for looking up and down; the keyboard is used for movement and supplemental inputs.

Many shooting genre players prefer a mouse over a gamepad analog stick because the wide range of motion offered by a mouse allows for faster and more varied control. Although an analog stick allows the player more granular control, it is poor for certain movements, as the player's input is relayed based on a vector of both the stick's direction and magnitude. Thus, a small but fast movement (known as "flick-shotting") using a gamepad requires the player to quickly move the stick from its rest position to the edge and back again in quick succession, a difficult maneuver. In addition the stick also has a finite magnitude; if the player is currently using the stick to move at a non-zero velocity their ability to increase the rate of movement of the camera is further limited based on the position their displaced stick was already at before executing the maneuver. The effect of this is that a mouse is well suited not only to small, precise movements but also to large, quick movements and immediate, responsive movements; all of which are important in shooter gaming. This advantage also extends in varying degrees to similar game styles such as third-person shooters.

Some incorrectly ported games or game engines have acceleration and interpolation curves which unintentionally produce excessive, irregular, or even negative acceleration when used with a mouse instead of their native platform's non-mouse default input device. Depending on how deeply hardcoded this misbehavior is, internal user patches or external 3rd-party software may be able to fix it. Individual game engines will also have their own sensitivities. This often restricts one from taking a game's existing sensitivity, transferring it to another, and acquiring the same 360 rotational measurements. A sensitivity converter is required in order to translate rotational movements properly.

Due to their similarity to the WIMP desktop metaphor interface for which mice were originally designed, and to their own tabletop game origins, computer strategy games are most commonly played with mice. In particular, real-time strategy and MOBA games usually require the use of a mouse.

The left button usually controls primary fire. If the game supports multiple fire modes, the right button often provides secondary fire from the selected weapon. Games with only a single fire mode will generally map secondary fire to aim down the weapon sights. In some games, the right button may also invoke accessories for a particular weapon, such as allowing access to the scope of a sniper rifle or allowing the mounting of a bayonet or silencer.

Players can use a scroll wheel for changing weapons (or for controlling scope-zoom magnification, in older games). On most first person shooter games, programming may also assign more functions to additional buttons on mice with more than three controls. A keyboard usually controls movement (for example, WASD for moving forward, left, backward, and right, respectively) and other functions such as changing posture. Since the mouse serves for aiming, a mouse that tracks movement accurately and with less lag (latency) will give a player an advantage over players with less accurate or slower mice. In some cases the right mouse button may be used to move the player forward, either in lieu of, or in conjunction with the typical WASD configuration.

Many games provide players with the option of mapping their own choice of a key or button to a certain control. An early technique of players, circle strafing, saw a player continuously strafing while aiming and shooting at an opponent by walking in circle around the opponent with the opponent at the center of the circle. Players could achieve this by holding down a key for strafing while continuously aiming the mouse toward the opponent.

Games using mice for input are so popular that many manufacturers make mice specifically for gaming. Such mice may feature adjustable weights, high-resolution optical or laser components, additional buttons, ergonomic shape, and other features such as adjustable CPI. Mouse Bungees are typically used with gaming mice because it eliminates the annoyance of the cable.

Many games, such as first- or third-person shooters, have a setting named "invert mouse" or similar (not to be confused with "button inversion", sometimes performed by left-handed users) which allows the user to look downward by moving the mouse forward and upward by moving the mouse backward (the opposite of non-inverted movement). This control system resembles that of aircraft control sticks, where pulling back causes pitch up and pushing forward causes pitch down; computer joysticks also typically emulate this control-configuration.

After id Software's commercial hit of Doom, which did not support vertical aiming, competitor Bungie's Marathon became the first first-person shooter to support using the mouse to aim up and down. Games using the Build engine had an option to invert the Y-axis. The "invert" feature actually made the mouse behave in a manner that users  regard as non-inverted (by default, moving mouse forward resulted in looking down). Soon after, id Software released Quake, which introduced the invert feature as users  know it.

Home consoles 

In 1988, the VTech Socrates educational video game console featured a wireless mouse with an attached mouse pad as an optional controller used for some games. In the early 1990s, the Super Nintendo Entertainment System video game system featured a mouse in addition to its controllers. A mouse was also released for the Nintendo 64, although it was only released in Japan. The 1992 game Mario Paint in particular used the mouse's capabilities, as did its Japanese-only successor Mario Artist on the N64 for its 64DD disk drive peripheral in 1999. Sega released official mice for their Genesis/Mega Drive, Saturn and Dreamcast consoles. NEC sold official mice for its PC Engine and PC-FX consoles. Sony released an official mouse product for the PlayStation console, included one along with the Linux for PlayStation 2 kit, as well as allowing owners to use virtually any USB mouse with the PS2, PS3, and PS4. Nintendo's Wii also had this feature implemented in a later software update, and this support was retained on its successor, the Wii U. Microsoft's Xbox line of game consoles (which used operaring systems based on modified versions of Windows NT) also had universal-wide mouse support using USB.

See also 

 Computer accessibility
 Footmouse
 Graphics tablet
 Gesture recognition
 Human–computer interaction (HCI)
 Mouse keys
 Mouse tracking
 Optical trackpad
 Pointing stick
 Rotational mouse

Notes

References

Further reading 
  (11 pages) (NB. This is based on an earlier German article published in 1996 in Lab. Jahrbuch 1995/1996 für Künste und Apparate (350 pages) by Kunsthochschule für Medien Köln mit dem Verein der Freunde der Kunsthochschule für Medien Köln;  in Cologne, Germany. .)

External links 

 Doug Engelbart Institute mouse resources page includes stories and links
 The video segment of The Mother of All Demos with Doug Engelbart showing the device from 1968

American inventions
 
Computing input devices
History of human–computer interaction
Pointing devices
Video game control methods
Computer-related introductions in 1964